Precis pelarga, the fashion commodore, is a species of butterfly in the family Nymphalidae which is native to tropical sub-Saharan Africa.

Description
The forewings are falcate. A clearer band crosses the forewings and hindwings. This band is orange white in the wet season, bluish white in the dry season (seasonal polymorphism). The basal area of the wings is brown, while the margins are blackish, with a series of small white spots. The undersides of the wings are variegated, with yellowish-brown cryptic colours, mimicking dead leaves. Larvae feed on Solenostemon and Coleus (Lamiaceae species).

Distribution
This species is present in tropical Africa (Senegal, Angola, Zambia, Democratic Republic of the Congo, Uganda, western Kenya,  Ethiopia, and Eritrea).

Habitat

References
 "Precis Hübner, [1819]" at Markku Savela's Lepidoptera and Some Other Life Forms

External links
 Learn about butterflies
 Fleeting Wonders
 Precis pelarga at Tree of Life web

Butterflies described in 1775
Junoniini
Butterflies of Africa
Taxa named by Johan Christian Fabricius